Pfitzer is a German surname. Notable people with the surname include:

 Ernst Hugo Heinrich Pfitzer (1846–1906), German botanist 
 Wilhelm Pfitzer (1821–1905), German horticulturist

German-language surnames